Jastrebci is a small dispersed settlement in the hills northeast of Ormož in northeastern Slovenia, right on the border with Croatia. The area belongs to the traditional region of Styria and is now included in the Drava Statistical Region.

References

External links
Jastrebci on Geopedia

Populated places in the Municipality of Ormož